Anomalous diffusion is a diffusion process with a non-linear relationship between the mean squared displacement (MSD), and time. This behavior is in stark contrast to Brownian motion, the typical diffusion process described by Einstein and Smoluchowski, where the MSD is linear in time (namely,  with d being the number of dimensions and D the diffusion coefficient). Examples of anomalous diffusion in nature have been observed in biology in the cell nucleus, plasma membrane and cytoplasm.

In Brownian motion, α = 1. If α > 1, the process is superdiffusive. Superdiffusion can be the result of active cellular transport processes or due to jumps with a heavy-tail distribution. If α < 1, the particle undergoes subdiffusion. 

The role of anomalous diffusion has received attention within the literature to describe many physical scenarios, most prominently within crowded systems, for example protein diffusion within cells, or diffusion through porous media.  Subdiffusion has been proposed as a measure of macromolecular crowding in the cytoplasm. It has been found that equations describing normal diffusion are not capable of characterizing some complex diffusion processes, for instance, diffusion process in inhomogeneous or heterogeneous medium, e.g. porous media. Fractional diffusion equations were introduced in order to characterize anomalous diffusion phenomena.

Recently, anomalous diffusion was found in several systems including ultra-cold atoms, harmonic spring-mass systems, scalar mixing in the interstellar medium,  telomeres in the nucleus of cells, ion channels in the plasma membrane, colloidal particle in the cytoplasm, moisture transport in cement-based materials, and worm-like micellar solutions.

In 1926, using weather balloons, Lewis Fry Richardson demonstrated that the atmosphere exhibits super-diffusion. Because the scale of motions in the atmosphere is not limited, as in rivers or the subsurface, a plume continues to experience larger mixing motions as it increases in size, which also increases its diffusivity, resulting in super-diffusion.

Types of anomalous diffusion 
Of interest within the scientific community, when an anomalous-type diffusion process is discovered, the challenge is to understand the underlying mechanism which causes it. There are a number of frameworks which give rise to anomalous diffusion that are currently in vogue within the statistical physics community. These are long range correlations between the signals continuous-time random walks (CTRW ) and fractional Brownian motion (fBm), and diffusion in disordered media. 

Currently the most studied types of anomalous diffusion processes are those involving  the following

 Generalizations of Brownian motion, such as the fractional Brownian motion and scaled Brownian motion
 Diffusion in fractals and percolation in porous media
 Continuous time random walks

These processes have growing interest in cell biophysics where the mechanism behind anomalous diffusion has direct physiological importance. Of particular interest, works by the groups of Eli Barkai, Maria Garcia Parajo, Joseph Klafter, Diego Krapf, and Ralf Metzler have shown that the motion of molecules in live cells often show a type of anomalous diffusion that breaks the ergodic hypothesis. This type of motion require novel formalisms for the underlying statistical physics because approaches using microcanonical ensemble and Wiener–Khinchin theorem break down.

Hyper-ballistic diffusion
One important class of anomalous diffusion refers to the case when the scaling exponent of the MSD increases with value greater  than 2. Such case is called hyper-ballistic diffusion and it has been observed in optical systems.

See also

Long term correlations

References

External links
 Boltzmann's transformation, Parabolic law (animation)
 Anomalous interface shift kinetics (Computer simulations and Experiments)

Physical chemistry